James Bisset may refer to:
 James Bisset (artist) (1762–1832), Scottish-born artist, manufacturer, art dealer and poet
 James Bisset (Royal Navy officer) (1760–1824), Scottish commander in the Royal Navy
 James Bisset (mayor) (1836–1919), architect, civil engineer and mayor of Wynberg, South Africa
 James Gordon Partridge Bisset (1883–1967), British merchant sea captain
 James Bisset (minister)  (1795–1872), minister of the Church of Scotland

See also
 James Bissett (disambiguation)